Enak Gavaggio (born May 4, 1976) is a French freestyle skier. He represented France at the 2010 Winter Olympics in Vancouver.

References

External links 
 
 

1976 births
French male freestyle skiers
Olympic freestyle skiers of France
Freestyle skiers at the 2010 Winter Olympics
Living people